Fort Dauphin, was built in 1741 near Winnipegosis, Manitoba with Pierre Gaultier de La Vérendrye, the western military commander, directing construction.  The area provided a post located between the Assiniboine River and the Saskatchewan River.  It was named for the Dauphin prince of France.

A second Fort Dauphin was built in 1767 on the north shore of Lake Dauphin, so both the fort and the lake had the same name.  This fort was built by French fur traders after the era of the western military commanders.  As with many of the forts of the times, they kept the same names while changing locations to facilitate trade with the First Nations and to secure better physical locations.

The site at Winnipegosis was designated a National Historic Site of Canada in 1943.

References

External links 

 
 
 

1741 establishments in the French colonial empire
Dauphin
Dauphin
National Historic Sites in Manitoba
Hudson's Bay Company forts